David Duggan (born July 16, 1963) is an American football coach and former player who is currently the director of recruiting at Troy University. Prior to Troy, he was the defensive coordinator at Arkansas State University. Duggan served as the head coach for the Cologne Centurions of NFL Europe from 2006 to 2007, where he compiled a record of 10–9.

Early life
A native of Maynard, Massachusetts, Duggan played four years of football at the University of New Hampshire. He served as captain in 1986 while playing linebacker for the Wildcats.

Coaching career
Duggan began his coaching career in 1987 at Allegheny College where he worked with the inside linebackers. During his one year stay with the Gators, they won the North Coast Athletic Conference title and participated in the NCAA Division III playoffs. In 1988, he returned to his alma mater for a four-year stint as linebackers coach with the Wildcats. In his final year at UNH, the Wildcats won the Yankee Conference title and participated in the NCAA Division I-AA playoffs.

After the 2011 season, Duggan followed head coach Larry Fedora to the University of North Carolina, where he was named outside linebackers coach and special teams coordinator on January 3, 2012. He spent one season in that capacity before returning to Southern Miss as the defensive coordinator and linebackers coach under newly hired head coach Todd Monken in January 2013.

On August 19, 2019, Duggan was named acting head coach of Arkansas State following head coach Blake Anderson's decision to take a leave of absence. Duggan had been named defensive coordinator of the team earlier in the year.

Duggan was fired on October 16, 2020, less than 24 hours after the Red Wolves defense gave up 52 points against Georgia State.

Duggan was named the director of recruiting at Troy on March 31, 2021.

Personal life
Duggan and his wife, Lynne, have two daughters, Olivia and Grace. He graduated from the University of New Hampshire in 1986 with a degree in physical education.

Head coaching record

References

External links
 North Carolina profile
 Southern Miss profile

1963 births
Living people
Allegheny Gators football coaches
American football linebackers
Berlin Thunder coaches
Brown Bears football coaches
Cologne Centurions (NFL Europe) coaches
Holy Cross Crusaders football coaches
New Hampshire Wildcats football coaches
New Hampshire Wildcats football players
North Carolina Tar Heels football coaches
People from Concord, Massachusetts
Players of American football from Massachusetts
Southern Miss Golden Eagles football coaches
Sportspeople from Middlesex County, Massachusetts
Troy Trojans football coaches
Western Michigan Broncos football coaches